Cordova School District (CSD) is a school district headquartered in Cordova, Alaska. It operates two schools,  Mt. Eccles Elementary School and Cordova Jr./Sr. High School.

References

External links
 
 Profile from the Alaska Department of Education

Cordova, Alaska
Education in Unorganized Borough, Alaska
School districts in Alaska